Patrick John Joseph Roberts (born 5 February 1997) is an English professional footballer who  plays as a winger for Championship club Sunderland.

Club career

Fulham
Having joined Fulham from AFC Wimbledon at the age of 13, Roberts signed his first professional contract shortly after his 17th birthday in February 2014, tying himself to the club until the summer of 2016. Roberts described signing the contract as "one of the best feelings I've ever had in my life".

Roberts was named among Fulham's substitutes for the first time on 15 March 2014 for a Premier League game against Newcastle United, with Fulham manager Felix Magath describing Roberts after the match as "an extraordinary talent". On 22 March 2014, he made his debut as a 55th-minute substitute in a Premier League defeat to Manchester City. On 5 May, he scored in the second leg of the 2014 FA Youth Cup final, which Fulham lost 7–6 on aggregate to Chelsea. Roberts' first appearance of the 2014–2015 campaign came as a substitute in Fulham's opening day fixture at Ipswich Town on 9 August, where he managed to grab an assist shortly after coming on. He made his first start for the Cottagers on 20 August 2014 in a home match against Wolverhampton Wanderers.

Manchester City
On 19 July 2015, Roberts signed for Manchester City on a long-term deal for an undisclosed fee, believed to be in the region of £12 million. Roberts made his debut coming on as a substitute for Jesús Navas against Real Madrid in the pre-season 2015 International Champions Cup. On 22 September 2015, Roberts made his first team debut for Manchester City when he came on as a substitute during a 4–1 win against Sunderland in the League Cup. He made his league debut for Manchester City in a 4–1 loss to Tottenham Hotspur, coming on as a substitute for Sergio Agüero.

Loans to Celtic
On 29 January 2016, it was reported that Celtic had agreed an 18-month loan deal with Manchester City for Roberts, while the player was in Glasgow for a medical. The transfer was confirmed on 1 February. He played for the U20 side a couple of days later in a 4–0 win over Motherwell, scoring Celtic's fourth in the last minute and providing assists for the other three goals. Roberts made his first team debut for Celtic on 20 February 2016, coming on a substitute for the final few minutes of Celtic's 3–0 league win over Inverness CT at Celtic Park. He was given his first starting appearance on 2 March in a league match at home against Dundee. Celtic could only draw 0–0, but Roberts was noted to have looked "sharp" and showed "flashes of his talent".

On 2 April 2016, Roberts scored his first competitive club goal, netting a brace for Celtic in a 3–1 come-from-behind win over Hearts. Following an impressive run of form during which he netted three goals, Roberts was named Scottish Player of the Month for April. He scored another brace on 8 May in a 3–2 win over Aberdeen, in the process helping Celtic clinch the Scottish Premiership title. Roberts scored another goal on the final day of the season in a 7–0 drubbing of Motherwell, thereby ending the campaign with 7 goals in 12 appearances for Celtic.

Roberts made his first ever Champions League appearance on 20 July 2016, starting and scoring in a 3–0 win over Lincoln Red Imps. He had previously rejected the opportunity to represent England at the U19 European Championship in order to help Celtic progress to the Champions League proper. On 6 December 2016, Roberts scored an impressive solo goal and was named man of the match in a Champions League match against his parent club Manchester City. He finished the 2016–17 season with 43 appearances and 15 goals, helping Celtic to complete an unbeaten domestic season, in which the club secured its sixth consecutive league title.

On 28 August 2017, it was announced that Roberts had rejoined Celtic on a new season-long loan. In November, during a match against Motherwell, Roberts suffered a hamstring injury and was sidelined for a number of months. He made his return against the same opposition on 18 March 2018 when he came on a substitute for James Forrest in a 0–0 draw.

Loan to Girona
Roberts joined Manchester City's Spanish partner club Girona for the 2018–19 season, with Manchester City saying that the ideal next stage in Robert's development would be testing himself in La Liga, one of the world's most technical leagues. At the time of signing he was the only English player playing in the Spanish top flight and he made his debut the following day as a substitute against Real Valladolid. He endured a difficult campaign, however, and failed to score in 19 league appearances as the club suffered relegation to the Segunda División.

Loan to Norwich City
Roberts was the first new addition to most-recent Championship winners and therefore newly-promoted Premier League club Norwich City, signing for them on a season-long loan.

Loans to Middlesbrough
On 2 January 2020, Roberts joined Middlesbrough on loan until the end of the 2019–20 season. He scored his first goal for Middlesbrough in a 2–1 win over Reading on 14 July 2020. On 12 October 2020, it was announced that he would be loaned to the club again for the duration of the 2020–21 campaign.

Loan to Derby County
On 1 February 2021, Roberts joined Derby County on loan for the remainder of the 2020–21 season. Two days later, he made his debut for the Rams as a substitute for Kamil Jóźwiak in a 0–3 away league defeat by Rotherham United.

Loan to Troyes
On 31 August 2021 he moved on loan to French club Troyes.

Sunderland
On 21 January 2022, Roberts joined League One side Sunderland on an initial short-term six-month deal with the club having the option to extend his contract. He scored his first goal for Sunderland in a 2–0 win over Crewe Alexandra on 12 March 2022. On 9 May 2022 he scored the winning goal for Sunderland in the 2nd leg of the League 1 play off semi-final against Sheffield Wednesday, to send them to the play-off final at Wembley Stadium. On 25 June 2022, Roberts signed a new two-year contract with the club after achieving promotion through the play-offs.

International career

E Dolan recommended that he play for
Ireland but Roberts has represented England at under-16, under-17 and under-19 levels. He played an integral role in England's victory at the 2014 European Under-17 Championship in Malta, scoring three goals, grabbing four assists and being named in the team of the tournament.

In August 2014 Roberts received his first call up to the England under-19 squad. Despite being just 17 years old at the time, Roberts played a big part in the England under-19 team's progression through the 2015 UEFA European Under-19 Championship qualifying round. In the three group games played by England under-19, Roberts recorded a total of four goals and four assists. He had previously rejected the chance to be in the England squad at the U19 European Championship in order to help Celtic progress to the Champions League proper. Roberts was also expected to be selected for the England under-20 squad in the 2017 FIFA U-20 World Cup, but he instead opted to play for Celtic in the 2017 Scottish Cup Final.

Personal life
Roberts was born in Kingston upon Thames, Greater London. His parents (Louise and Neil) are both from Merseyside. He has an older brother Adam and a younger sister Jessica. He is a fan of Liverpool F.C. He is an alumnus of Wimbledon College.

Career statistics

Honours
Celtic
Scottish Premiership: 2015–16, 2016–17, 2017–18
Scottish Cup: 2016–17, 2017–18
Scottish League Cup: 2016–17, 2017–18

Girona
Supercopa de Catalunya: 2018–19

Sunderland
 EFL League One play-offs: 2022

England U16
Victory Shield: 2012–13

England U17
UEFA European Under-17 Championship: 2014

Individual
UEFA European Under-17 Championship Team of the Tournament: 2014
Scottish Premiership Player of the Month: April 2016

References

External links

 Player Profile at Manchester City
 
 

1997 births
Living people
Footballers from Kingston upon Thames
People educated at Wimbledon College
English footballers
England youth international footballers
English expatriate footballers
Association football wingers
AFC Wimbledon players
Fulham F.C. players
Manchester City F.C. players
Celtic F.C. players
Girona FC players
Norwich City F.C. players
Middlesbrough F.C. players
Derby County F.C. players
ES Troyes AC players
Sunderland A.F.C. players
Premier League players
English Football League players
Scottish Professional Football League players
La Liga players
Championnat National 3 players
Ligue 1 players
Expatriate footballers in Spain
English expatriate sportspeople in Spain
Expatriate footballers in France
English expatriate sportspeople in France